Al-Abbas ibn Ali ibn Abi Talib (15 May 647 - 10 October 680 CE), also known as Abu al-Fadl, was son of Ali ibn Abi Talib, the Muslim caliph and the first Shia imam. His mother was Fatima bint Hizam, commonly known as Umm al-Banin.

Abbas fought as the standard-bearer of his half-brother Husayn ibn Ali in the Battle of Karbala on 10 Muharram 61 AH (10 October 680 CE). He was killed in a desperate attempt to bring water from the Euphrates to quench the unbearable thirst of the besieged family of Muhammad. Shia Imams are reported to have praised Abbas for his faith and fortitude in defending Husayn.

Abbas is said to have inherited Ali's boldness and bravery, and is regarded by Shia Muslims as an ultimate paragon of courage and self-sacrifice. Often described in sources as tall and handsome, he was also known by the epithet Qamar Bani Hashim. The shrine of Abbas and the nearby mausoleum of Husayn in Karbala are destinations for pilgrimage.

Titles 
The kunya of Abbas was Abu al-Fadl. Another epithet of Abbas was Qamar Bani Hashim, and he is often described in sources as tall and handsome, whose legs reached the ground when he rode his white stallion.

Abbas is said to have inherited Ali's boldness and bravery, always carrying the victorious standard on the battlefield. When describing Abbas, Hazleton writes that he wore two white egret's plumes atop his chain mail helmet, a distinction reserved only for the bravest warrior. Calmard further draws a parallel between Abbas and Muhammad ibn al-Hanafiyya, an elder son of Ali and his standard-bearer, saying that Abbas fulfilled the same warrior functions near Husayn.

Abbas is also known as Alam-d'ar for his role in the Battle of Karbala, and as al-Saqqa' and Abu al-Qirba ( means 'a water-skin') for his desperate attempt on the evening of Ashura to bring water from the Euphrates to quench the unbearable thirst of the besieged Ahl al-Bayt.

Birth and early life
Abbas was born in Medina to Ali and Fatima bint Hizam ibn Khalid ibn Rabi'a of the Banu Kilab. Abbas had three full brothers, namely, Abd Allah, Ja'far and Uthman, and their mother Fatima thus became known as Umm al-Banin. Abbas' brothers were all killed in the Battle of Karbala just before him. Some sources refer to him as al-Abbas al-Akbar to distinguish him from another son of Ali, al-Abbas al-Asghar.

Abbas' date of birth is disputed. Ibn Sa'd writes that he had not yet reached puberty when Ali was assassinated in 40/661, whereas some others have claimed that Abbas was thirty-four at the time, and the Shia Bahr al-Ulum gives 4 Shaban 26 (15 May 647) as Abbas' birth date. Naturally, much of what exists in sources about Abbas is in connection with the Battle of Karbala.

Battle of Karbala and death (680)

Accession of Yazid 
Mu'awiya designated his son Yazid as his successor in 676, which violated his earlier agreement with Ali's eldest son Hasan. Yazid is often remembered by Muslim historians as a debaucher who openly violated the Islamic norms, and his nomination was thus met with resistance from the sons of Muhammad's prominent companions, including Husayn ibn Ali.

On Mu'awiya's death and Yazid's succession in 60/680, the latter instructed the governor of Medina to secure Husayn's pledge of allegiance by force, and Husayn thus fled to Mecca at night to avoid recognising Yazid as the caliph. He was accompanied by some relatives, including Abbas and his household.

Journey to Karbala 
After receiving letters of support from Kufans, whose intentions were confirmed by his cousin Muslim ibn Aqil, Husayn left Mecca for Kufa on 8 or 10 Dhu al-Hijja (10 or 12 September 680) with some relatives and supporters. In the canonical Shia al-Irshad, Husayn is reported to have said that his intention was to fight the tyranny of Yazid, even though he knew he was going to be killed. He similarly wrote in his will for his brother Ibn Hanafiyya that he had not set out to seek "corruption or oppression" but rather to "enjoin what is right and forbid what is wrong," as reported by Maqtal al-awalim and al-Maqtal.

On his way to Kufa, Husayn's small caravan was intercepted by Yazid's army and forced to camp in the desert land of Karbala on 2 Muharram 61 (2 October 680) away from water and fortifications. The promised support of the Kufans did not materialise as the new governor of Kufa, Ubayd Allah ibn Ziyad, killed Husayn's envoy and intimidated the Kufan tribal chiefs.

Water shortage 
On 7 Muharram, on orders of the Umayyad governor Ubayd Allah ibn Ziyad, the Umayyad commander Umar ibn Sa'd cut off Husayn's access to the water of the Euphrates. Abbas and some fifty companions were nevertheless able to bring back some water to Husayn's camp in a night sortie. Despite this attempt, Veccia Vaglieri believes that Husayn's camp suffered from thirst for three days, while Adibzadeh notes the hot desert climate of Karbala. Pinault similarly writes that the camp suffered from hunger and thirst during the siege, and the opinion of Hamdar is close.

Negotiations 
Ibn Sa'd was instructed by Ibn Ziyad not to let Husayn leave unless he pledged his allegiance to Yazid. Husayn did not submit to Yazid, but negotiated with Ibn Ziyad through Ibn Sa'd to be allowed to retreat and avoid bloodshed, but the governor did not relent, finally ordering Ibn Sa'd to fight, kill, and disfigure Husayn and his supporters unless they pledged allegiance to Yazid, in which case Ibn Ziyad would later decide whether to punish or forgive them.

Safe passage 
A member of the Banu Kilab and possibly related to Abbas' mother, the Umayyad commander Shamir ibn Dhi al-Jawshan acquired safe passage for Abbas and his three (full) brothers from Ibn Ziyad. According to Abu Mikhnaf, Ibn Ziyad's letter of protection was sent to Abbas and his brothers, who refused it, saying that, "God's protection is better than the one offered by Sumayya's son." Shamir again offered protection to Abbas and his brothers on the eve of the battle but this time they cursed him and pledged their full support to Husayn.

Tasu'a 
Ibn Sa'd decided to attack on Tasu'a (9 Muharram) after the afternoon prayer. As the Umayyad army approached, Abbas informed Husayn, who then sent Abbas and some companions to Ibn Sa'd, convincing him to delay the confrontation until the following day. Husayn now besieged his followers in a speech to leave and not risk their lives for his sake, after which Abbas was the first to renew his support, saying that he would follow his brother in life or death. Almost none of his followers deserted him.

Husayn and his companions spent the night praying and reading the Quran, reports Ibn Tawus and most  works. On this night, Zaynab bint Ali is said to have reminded her brother Abbas of their father's wish for the latter to be the reserves of Karbala, and to be to Husayn as Ali was to Muhammad. This Abbas confirmed and swore to do. There is a report by Ibn Tawus that Abbas was killed on Tasu'a in a failed sally to bring water, though most traditions place his death on Ashura.

Ashura 
On the morning of Ashura (10 Muharram), Husayn organised his supporters, some seventy-two men, and designated Abbas as his standard-bearer, an indication of his privileged position among the companions. Husayn then spoke to the enemy lines and asked them why they considered it lawful to kill Muhammad's grandson. The Umayyad commander al-Hurr ibn Yazid al-Tamimi defected to Husayn's side after this speech. The Umayyad army then showered the camp with arrows, thus commencing the battle which lasted from morning till sunset and consisted of incidents of single combat, skirmishes, assaults, and retreats. During the battle, Abbas helped rescue a group of companions who were surrounded by enemy horsemen. By the early afternoon, however, the companions all perished and were followed by the Banu Hashim.

Death 
The works of al-Tabari and al-Baladhuri are silent about the details of Abbas' death. Veccia Vaglieri argues that there must have existed traditions about his death and that the Shia Shaykh Mufid have reported them, saying that Abbas and Husayn were separated when they attempted to reach the Euphrates in the ultimate episode of the battle, adding that Abbas fought valiantly until the end.

Another well-known account is reported by the Shia Ibn Tawus and others: Perhaps anguished by the cries of Husayn's children, Abbas set out for the Euphrates on the eve of Ashura and managed to fill his water-skin, but was blocked by the enemy near the river bank and far from Husayn's camp. Fighting alone, both his arms were severed and he was then killed. After Husayn's last warrior fell, the Umayyad army converged on the lone Imam, who also fought until the end. The account by Kashefi in Rawzat al-shohada differs slightly in that Abbas is placed as the sixty-eighth casualty before Mohammad ibn Ali, Ali Akbar, and Ali Asghar.

Mufid's Kitab al-irshad names Zayd ibn Varqa' Hanafi and Hakim ibn al-Ṭofayl San'ani as Abbas' murderers. Abu Mikhnaf in his Maqtal adds that Husayn wept bitterly when his brother fell. Maqatil al-Talibiyyin by Abu al-Faraj al-Isfahani reports that Abbas' murderer dreamed of being flung into hell and woke up screaming every night. Reports from the Shia Imams Ali ibn al-Husayn and Ja'far ibn Muhammad highly praise Abbas for his faith and fortitude in defending Husayn.

Credibility 
Mufid and some others argue that Abbas' burial place, far from Husayn and his companions, adds to the credibility of this account, which is also corroborated by another report about Abbas' death attributed to Ali ibn al-Husayn. In support of this account, Bahramian and his co-author note that the traditional supplications for pilgrims mention Abbas' mission to fetch water and that his arms were severed. They also note that Abbas later became known as al-Saqqa' and Abu al-Qirba ( means 'a water-skin').

After his death 
After the battle, some Umayyad soldiers stripped Abbas' garments, and his corpse was thus dishonoured. As with Husayn and other companions, his head was severed and brought to Yazid in Damascus, in his case by Harmala ibn K'ahil al-Asadi, as reported by al-Tabari.

Shrine 
Abbas was buried where he was killed by the Banu Asad of the al-Ghadiriyya village, and a tomb was later erected over his grave. Abbas' shrine now has a golden dome and is located to the north-east of Husayn's mausoleum. Both shrines are built on a mound overlooking the city of Karbala, which has become a destination for pilgrimage and a centre for religious learning.

There exist special prayers and rituals for pilgrims and several Muslim figures are buried in the precinct of Abbas' shrine. There are also other shrines associated with Abbas elsewhere, including an old shrine near Tehran, considered by the locals to be the tomb of Abd Allah ibn Abbas.

Descendants
Abbas had a young son named Ubayd Allah, born to Lubaba bint Ubayd Allah ibn al-Abbas ibn Abd al-Muttalib, who is said to have been taken captive after the Battle of Karbala. Abbas' lineage continued through this child. In particular, the poetry by Abbas' descendants is collected in one of the chapters in al-Awraq by al-Suli. One of his descendants was Abbas ibn al-Hasan al-Alawi, who reached fame as a poet and scholar during the reigns of the Abbasid al-Rashid and al-Ma'mun. The Zanj rebellion was ignited in Iraq and Bahrain in the mid-third/ninth century by Ali ibn Muhammad Sahib al-Zanj, who claimed descent from Abbas.

Significance in Shia Islam 
Abbas is regarded by the Shia as an ultimate paragon of courage, chivalry, love, sincerity, and self-sacrifice. As such, Abbas is associated for the Shia with the alleviation of grief and suffering. Serious oaths are made in his name, and the Shia distribute food for charity as part of vows (s) made in the name of Abbas.

Muharram rituals 
Tasu'a (9 Muharram) is devoted by the Shia as the day of mourning for Abbas. He is celebrated in religious passion-plays (s) as the water carrier of the Ahl al-Bayt and the standard bearer of Husayn. The  of Abbas' death is among the oldest passion-plays and is frequently performed throughout the year. The green standards (s) carried in Muharram processions are often adorned on top with a metal hand representing Abbas' severed hand, with outstretched fingers that symbolise the Ahl al-Bayt. Food and water are distributed for charity to offer special oblation. From West Indies to the island of Java, Sunnis and Hindus also commonly participate in most Shia Muharram rituals.

Religious art 
Abbas is heavily featured in Shia art. Verses of poetry about him and his likeness historically appear in public religious buildings, particularly in the tile work of s (public drinking-water repositories), s and s (both are places to commemorate Husayn), and s (traditional Persian gymnasiums). Abbas is depicted in religious paintings often seated on a white horse and holding Husayn's banner while fighting enemies or holding a water-skin and surrounded by the womenfolk and children of the Ahl al-Bayt.

Significance in Bektashism 

According to the traditions of the Bektashi Order, a Sufi community based primarily in Albania, Abbas ibn Ali went to Albania on a white horse to save it from the barbarians and continues to return to Mount Tomorr in Albania for five days (August 20–25) each year, during which animal sacrifices are made and homage is paid to Abbas. During these five days, Bektashi pilgrims visit the Abbas Ali Türbe, a mausoleum believed to house the remains of Abbas. The mausoleum is located on the southern peak of Mount Tomorr, which was originally constructed in 1620. The mausoleum lies adjacent to the Bektashi tekke on Mount Tomorr, which was built in 1916.

See also

References

Sources

External links

Alkafeel global network

Tabi‘un
647 births
680 deaths
Children of Ali
Hashemite people
Muslim martyrs
Deaths by blade weapons
People of the Second Fitna
People killed at the Battle of Karbala